William Matthews was a prominent American bookbinder called "the most famous bookbinder America has produced".

Matthews was born in Scotland in 1822. In 1833 he was enrolled in the London Orphan Asylum, after leaving which, he apprenticed with London bookbinders Remnant and Edmonds. In December 1843 be emigrated to Brooklyn, New York where he would marry Julia Elizabeth Marle, daughter of bookbinder William Marle.

He was naturalized an American citizen in 1850.

He engaged in fine-art bookbinding, showing his work at the 1876 Philadelphia Centennial and the 1899 Paris Exhibition.

He is the author of Bookbinding: A Manual for Those Interested in the Craft of Bookbinding.

He died in 1896.

References

Bookbinders
1822 births
1896 deaths